Paranthrenella is a genus of moths in the family Sesiidae.

Species
 Paranthrenella koshiensis Gorbunov & Arita, 1999
 Paranthrenella albipuncta Gorbunov & Arita, 2000
 Paranthrenella cinnamoma Yu, Gao, Kallies, Arita & Wang, 2021
 Paranthrenella dortmundi Liang & Hsu, 2015
 Paranthrenella duporti (Le Cerf, 1927)
 Paranthrenella formosicola (Strand, 1916) 
 Paranthrenella helvola Liang & Hsu, 2019
 Paranthrenella mushana (Matsumura, 1931)
 Paranthrenella pensilis (Swinhoe, 1892)
 Paranthrenella phasiaeformis (Felder, 1861)
 Paranthrenella similis Gorbunov & Arita, 2000
 Paranthrenella subauratus (Le Cerf, 1916)
 Paranthrenella weiyui Liang & Hsu, 2015
 Paranthrenella auriplena (Walker, 1865)
 Paranthrenella brandti Kallies, 2020
 Paranthrenella chrysophanes (Meyrick, 1887)
 Paranthrenella lelatensis Kallies, 2020
 Paranthrenella melanocera (Hampson, 1919)
 Paranthrenella terminalia Kallies, 2020
 Paranthrenella xanthogyna (Hampson, 1919)

References

Sesiidae